Elections to Rossendale Borough Council were held on 3 May 2012.

Councillors elected in 2008 were defending their seats this year, with their vote share change compared to that year.

Election result

Ward results

References

2012
2012 English local elections
2010s in Lancashire